The 2009–10 season was a difficult one for Dynamo Dresden. The team's poor performance at the beginning of the season ultimately led to coach Ruud Kaiser losing his position. He was replaced by former Dynamo player Matthias Maucksch who was promoted from the reserve team. Under the new coach's guidance, the club finished the season in 12th place.

Squad

Results

3. Liga

DFB-Pokal

Saxony Cup

Transfers

External links
Season details at fussballdaten 

Dynamo Dresden seasons
Dynamo Dresden